Pichhore Assembly constituency is one of the 230 Vidhan Sabha (Legislative Assembly) constituencies of Madhya Pradesh state in central India.

Overview
Shivpuri (constituency number 26) is one of the 5 Vidhan Sabha constituencies located in Shivpuri district. This constituency covers the entire Khaniyadhana tehsil, Pichhore nagar panchayat and part of Pichhore tehsil of the district.

Pichhore is part of Guna Lok Sabha constituency along with seven other Vidhan Sabha segments, namely, Shivpuri and Kolaras in this district, Bamori and Guna in Guna district and Ashok Nagar, Chanderi and Mungaoli in Ashoknagar district.

Members of Legislative Assembly

As a constituency of Madhya Bharat
 1957: Laxmi Narayan Gupta, Hindu Mahasabha

As a constituency of Madhya Pradesh

See also
 Pichhore (disambiguation)

References

Shivpuri district
Assembly constituencies of Madhya Pradesh